Benito Sylvain (born Marie-Joseph Benoît d'Artagnan Sylvain; 21 March 1868 – 3 January 1915) was a Haitian  journalist, diplomat, lawyer. He was also of the organizers of the 1900 Pan-African Conference.

Sylvain pathed the connection between Afro-descendants and Africans and became a representative for these groups that were colonized by France. He is arguably considered to be a pioneer of Pan-Africanism.

Biography
Benito Sylvain was born in Port-de-Paix, Haiti, in 1868. In 1887, he finished his studies in Paris at the Collège Stanislas, then attended law lchool, where he obtained his license and then his doctorate.

Supported by his country that appoints the officer of Marine and secretary to the embassy in London, Sylvain founded in Paris in 1890 a weekly committed against French colonialism, La Fraternité (which appeared until 1897). 

In 1897, Sylvain staying in Ethiopia became the aide-de-camp to Emperor Menelik II, who defeated the Italians at the Battle of Adwa. Sylvain represented both Ethiopia and Haiti at the 1900 Pan-African Conference held in London, and was appointed as honorary president of the Pan African Association.

In 1906, Sylvain, who attend all lectures against slavery, published in Paris his principal work, entitled On the fate of the natives in the colonies of exploitation, an indictment against colonialism.

As there were very active Afro-descended students in France, including his compatriot Haitians, Sylvain endeavoured to make the connection between Afro-descendants and Africans, in a spirit of resistance to European colonialism, which he reasoned was a new form of slavery.

References

1868 births
1915 deaths
Haitian journalists
People from Port-de-Paix
Collège Stanislas de Paris alumni
French abolitionists